The St. Louis Red Stockings played their first and only season of professional baseball in 1875 as a member of the National Association of Professional Base Ball Players. They finished tenth in the league with a record of 4-15.

Regular season

Season standings

Record vs. opponents

Roster

Player stats

Batting
Note: G = Games played; AB = At bats; H = Hits; Avg. = Batting average; HR = Home runs; RBI = Runs batted in

Starting pitchers 
Note: G = Games pitched; IP = Innings pitched; W = Wins, L = Losses; ERA = Earned run average; SO = Strikeouts

References
1875 St. Louis Red Stockings season at Baseball Reference

St Louis Red Stockings Season, 1875